The , also known as Yi-feng li, was a Japanese lunisolar calendar (genka reki).

History
The calendar was created in China.  It was first used in the Rintoku era during the Tang Dynasty.

The  Gihō-reki system was brought from Korea to Japan between 676 and 678, during the Asuka period of Japanese history.  This calendar corrected errors in the Genka calendar which was also developed in China.  For a short time, both Genka and Gihō calendars were in use.

See also
 Japanese calendar
 Sexagenary cycle

References

Further reading
 Charlotte von Verschuer (1985).  Les relations officielles du Japon avec la Chine aux VIIIe et IXe siècles (Hachi-kyū-seiki no Nitchū kankei), pp. 243-245 n. 114.

External links
 National Diet Library, "The Japanese Calendar"

Specific calendars
History of science and technology in Japan
Time in Japan